Melvin Sokoloff (May 10, 1929 – February 2, 1990), known professionally as Mel Lewis, was an American jazz drummer, session musician, professor, and author. He received fourteen Grammy Award nominations.

Biography

Early years
Lewis was born in Buffalo, New York, to Russian-Jewish immigrant parents Samuel and Mildred Sokoloff. He started playing professionally as a teen, eventually joining Stan Kenton in 1954. His musical career brought him to Los Angeles in 1957 and New York City in 1963.

Career
In 1966 in New York, he teamed up with Thad Jones to lead the Thad Jones/Mel Lewis Orchestra. The group started as informal jam sessions with the top studio and jazz musicians of the city, but eventually began performing regularly on Monday nights at the famed venue, the Village Vanguard. In 1979, the band won a Grammy for their album Live in Munich. Like all of the musicians in the band, it was only a sideline. In 1976, he released an album titled Mel Lewis and Friends that featured him leading a smaller sextet that allowed freedom and improvisation.

When Jones moved to Denmark in 1978, the band became known as Mel Lewis and the Jazz Orchestra. Lewis continued to lead the band, recording and performing every Monday night at the Village Vanguard until shortly before his death from cancer at age 60. The band still performs on most Monday nights at the club. Today, it is known as the Vanguard Jazz Orchestra and has released several CDs.

Playing style and approach
Lewis's cymbal work was considered unique among many musicians. Of his style, drummer Buddy Rich had remarked: "Mel Lewis doesn't sound like anybody else. He sounds like himself."

Lewis insisted on playing genuine Turkish-made cymbals, switching from the Zildjian Company later in his career to the Istanbul brand. His setup included a 21-inch ride on his right, a 19-inch crash-ride on his left, and his signature sound, a 22-inch swish "knocker" with rivets on his far right. The rather lightweight cymbals exuded a dark, overtone-rich sound. Lewis' wood-shell drums were considered warm and rich in their sound. He almost exclusively played a Gretsch drums set, although in later years, played Slingerland drums equipped with natural calfskin top heads. Regular mylar heads were used on the bottom. Lewis described a playing philosophy of not "pushing or pulling" but "supporting." "If you watch me, it doesn't look like I'm doing much," he remarked in an interview.

Declining health and death
In the late 1980s, Lewis was diagnosed with melanoma. It was identified in his arm, then surfaced in his lungs, and ultimately went to his brain. He died on February 2, 1990, just days before his band was to celebrate its 24th anniversary at the Village Vanguard.

Discography
Mellifluous (Gatemouth, 1981)

Mel Lewis and the Orchestra
 Naturally (Telarc, 1979)
 Live in Montreux: Mel Lewis Plays Herbie Hancock (MPS, 1980))
 Live at the Village Vanguard...Featuring the Music of Bob Brookmeyer (1980)
 Mel Lewis and the Jazz Orchestra (Finesse, 1982)
 20 Years at the Village Vanguard (Atlantic, 1985)
 The Definitive Thad Jones, Live from the Village Vangard (Nimbus, 1988)
 Definitive Thad Jones, Vol. 1 (MusicMasters, 1988)
 Definitive Thad Jones, Vol. 2 (MusicMasters, 1988)
 Soft Lights and Hot Music (MusicMasters, 1988)
 To You: A Tribute to Mel Lewis (MusicMasters, 1990)

Thad Jones/Mel Lewis Orchestra
 Opening Night (recorded 1966, released Alan Grant Presents, 2000) 
 Presenting Thad Jones / Mel Lewis and the Jazz Orchestra (Solid State, 1966) 
 Presenting Joe Williams and Thad Jones / Mel Lewis, The Jazz Orchestra (Solid State, 1966) 
 Live at the Village Vanguard (Solid State, 1967)
 The Big Band Sound of Thad Jones / Mel Lewis Featuring Miss Ruth Brown (Solid State, 1968)
 Monday Night (Solid State, 1968)
 Central Park North (Solid State, 1969)
 Basle, 1969 (recorded 1969, released TCB, 1996)
 Consummation (Blue Note, 1970)
 Live in Tokyo (Denon, 1974)
 Potpourri (Philadelphia International, 1974) 
 Thad Jones / Mel Lewis and Manuel De Sica (Pausa, 1974) 
 Suite for Pops (A&M, 1975)
 New Life: Dedicated to Max Gordon (A&M, 1975)
 Thad Jones / Mel Lewis Orchestra With Rhoda Scott aka Rhoda Scott in New York with... (1976)
 Live in Munich (A&M, 1976) 
 It Only Happens Every Time (1977) EMI – with Monica Zetterlund
 Body and Soul aka Thad Jones / Mel Lewis Orchestra in Europe (1978) West Wind – Live in Berlin
 A Touch of Class (West Wind, 1978)  – Live in Warsaw

Thad Jones Mel Lewis Quartet
The Thad Jones Mel Lewis Quartet (Artists House, 1978)

Mel Lewis
Mel Lewis Sextet (Mode Records, 1957)
Mel Lewis and Friends (A&M, 1977)

Video
 Jazz Casual – Thad Jones / Mel Lewis Orchestra... (recorded 1968) – a 1968 television appearance

Compilations
 The Blue Note Reissue Series: Thad Jones / Mel Lewis (Blue Note, recorded 1966 – 1970)
 The Complete Solid State Recordings of the Thad Jones / Mel Lewis Orchestra (recorded 1966 – 1970, Blue Note, 1994)
 In Europe (ITM, 2007)
 The Complete (Live in) Poland Concerts 1976 & 1978 (Gambit, 2009)

Jones and Lewis as guests with other orchestras
 Greetings and Salutations (1975) Town Crier – Jones, Lewis and Jon Faddis with the Swedish Radio Jazz Group, Stockholm
 Thad Jones, Mel Lewis and UMO (1977) RCA Records – Jones and Lewis with the UMO Jazz Orchestra, Helsinki

As sideman
With Pepper Adams
Pepper Adams Quintet (Mode, 1957)
Critic's Choice (World Pacific, 1957)
Ephemera (Spotlite, 1973)
With Manny Albam
Brass on Fire (Sold State, 1966)
With Chet Baker
Theme Music from "The James Dean Story" (World Pacific, 1956) with Bud Shank
Once Upon a Summertime (Artists House, 1977 [1980])
With Bob Brookmeyer
Bob Brookmeyer Plays Bob Brookmeyer and Some Others (Clef, 1955)
The Dual Role of Bob Brookmeyer (Prestige, 1955)
7 x Wilder (Verve, 1961)
Gloomy Sunday and Other Bright Moments (Verve, 1961)
Back Again (Sonet, 1978)
With Kenny Burrell
Blue Bash! (Verve, 1963) – with Jimmy Smith
Ellington Is Forever (Fantasy, 1975)
With Benny Carter
Sax ala Carter! (United Artists, 1960)
BBB & Co. (Swingville, 1962) with Ben Webster and Barney Bigard
Central City Sketches (MusicMasters, 1987)
With Buck Clayton
A Swingin' Dream (Stash, 1989)
With Al Cohn
Son of Drum Suite (RCA Victor, 1960)
Jazz Mission to Moscow (Colpix, 1962)
Body and Soul (Muse, 1973) with Zoot Sims
With Bob Cooper
Coop! The Music of Bob Cooper (Contemporary, 1958)
With Hank Crawford and Jimmy McGriff
Soul Survivors (Milestone, 1986)
With Eddie Daniels
First Prize! (Prestige, 1967)
With Eric Dolphy
Live in Germany (Magnetic, 1961 / 1992)
With Maynard Ferguson
The Blues Roar (Mainstream, 1965)
With Stan Getz
Stan Getz Plays Music from the Soundtrack of Mickey One (MGM, 1965)
With Dizzy Gillespie
The New Continent (Limelight, 1962)
With Jimmy Hamilton
It's About Time (Swingville, 1961)
With Johnny Hodges
Sandy's Gone (Verve, 1963)
With Thad Jones and Pepper Adams Quintet
Mean What You Say (Milestone, 1966)
With Stan Kenton
Contemporary Concepts (Capitol, 1955)
Kenton in Hi-Fi (Capitol, 1956)
Cuban Fire! (Capitol, 1956)
Kenton with Voices (Capitol, 1957)
The Ballad Style of Stan Kenton (Capitol, 1958)
With Jimmy Knepper
Dream Dancing (Criss Cross, 1986)
With Peggy Lee
Sugar 'n' Spice (Capitol, 1962)
Mink Jazz (Capitol, 1963)
With Joe Lovano
Tones, Shapes & Colors (Soul Note, 1985)
With Johnny Mandel 
I Want to Live (United Artists, 1958)
With Herbie Mann
Great Ideas of Western Mann (Riverside, 1957)
The Magic Flute of Herbie Mann (Verve, 1957)
Impressions of the Middle East (Atlantic, 1966)
The Herbie Mann String Album (Atlantic, 1967)
With Warne Marsh
Star Highs (Criss Cross Jazz, 1982)
With Jack McDuff
Prelude (Prestige, 1963)
With Gary McFarland
The Jazz Version of "How to Succeed in Business without Really Trying" (Verve, 1962)
Point of Departure (Impulse!, 1963)
Tijuana Jazz (Impulse!, 1965)
With Jimmy McGriff
A Bag Full of Blues (Solid State, 1967)
The Worm (Solid State, 1968)
With James Moody
Great Day (Argo, 1963)
Moody and the Brass Figures (Milestone, 1966)
With Bette Midler
Thighs and Whispers (Atlantic, 1979)
With Gerry Mulligan
Gerry Mulligan Meets Johnny Hodges (Verve, 1959) with Johnny Hodges
The Concert Jazz Band (Verve, 1960)
Gerry Mulligan and the Concert Jazz Band on Tour (Verve, 1960 [1962])
Gerry Mulligan and the Concert Jazz Band at the Village Vanguard (Verve, 1960 [1961])
Holliday with Mulligan (DRG, 1961 [1980]) with Judy Holliday
Gerry Mulligan Presents a Concert in Jazz (Verve, 1961)
Two of a Mind (RCA Victor, 1962) with Paul Desmond
With Mark Murphy
This Could Be the Start of Something (Capitol, 1959)
Mark Murphy's Hip Parade (Capitol, 1960)
With Anita O'Day
Cool Heat (Verve, 1959)
All the Sad Young Men (Verve, 1962)
With Chico O'Farrill
Nine Flags (Impulse!, 1966)
With Shorty Rogers
Gigi in Jazz (RCA Victor, 1958)
Chances Are It Swings (RCA Victor, 1958)
The Wizard of Oz and Other Harold Arlen Songs (RCA Victor, 1959)
The Swingin' Nutcracker (RCA Victor, 1960) 
An Invisible Orchard (RCA Victor, 1961 [1997])
Jazz Waltz (Reprise, 1962)
With Pete Rugolo
Percussion at Work (EmArcy, 1957)
Behind Brigitte Bardot (Warner Bros., 1960)
With Sal Salvador
Starfingers (Bee Hive, 1978)
With Shirley Scott
Latin Shadows (Impulse!, 1965)
With Bud Shank
Bud Shank - Shorty Rogers - Bill Perkins (Pacific Jazz, 1955)
New Groove (Pacific Jazz, 1961)
With Sonny Stitt
Sonny Stitt Blows the Blues (Verve, 1959)
Saxophone Supremacy (Verve, 1959)
Sonny Stitt Swings the Most (Verve, 1959)
With Gerald Wilson 
You Better Believe It! (Pacific Jazz, 1961)
Moment of Truth (Pacific Jazz, 1962)
Portraits (Pacific Jazz, 1964)
With Jimmy Witherspoon
Blues for Easy Livers (Prestige, 1965)

Filmography

Concert performances
1999:  Jazz at the Smithsonian (Kultur Video)
2003:  Jazz Casual – Thad Jones & Mel Lewis and Woody Herman (Jazz Casual)
2005:  Jazz Masters Series – Mel Lewis and the Jazz Orchestra (Shanachie)
2007:  Mel Lewis and His Big Band (VIEW)

Film
1958: Kings Go Forth - Jazz Musician: Drums (uncredited)

Sources

External links
 Allmusic.com – Biography by Scott Yanow
 Falzerano, Chet (1995). Gretsch Drums: The Legacy of That Great Gretsch Sound. Publisher: Centerstream Publications. 

Mel Lewis at Drummerworld
Mel Lewis at The Percussive Arts Society
The Mel Lewis Collection at the Miller Nichols Library of the University of Missouri–Kansas City
History of Jazz Drumming interview recordings

1929 births
1990 deaths
American jazz drummers
American jazz bandleaders
Big band bandleaders
West Coast jazz drummers
American people of Russian-Jewish descent
Grammy Award winners
Musicians from Buffalo, New York
Atlantic Records artists
Red Baron Records artists
Deaths from melanoma
20th-century American drummers
American male drummers
Jazz musicians from New York (state)
20th-century American male musicians
American male jazz musicians
The Thad Jones/Mel Lewis Orchestra members
American Jazz Orchestra members
Black Lion Records artists